St Columb's Cathedral in the walled city of Derry, Northern Ireland, is the cathedral church and episcopal see of the Church of Ireland's Diocese of Derry and Raphoe. It is also the parish church of Templemore. It is dedicated to Saint Columba, the Irish monk who established a Christian settlement in the area before being exiled from Ireland and introducing Christianity to Scotland and northern England. Built after the Reformation in Ireland, St Columb's is the first Anglican cathedral to have been built in the British Isles after the Reformation and was the first non-Roman Catholic cathedral to be built in Western Europe.

History
The original site of the diocesan cathedral was in Templemore ( or "the Big Church"). Due to the violence of the Nine Years' War, the church was destroyed. It was first damaged by an accidental explosion on 24 April 1568, the church having been appropriated for the storage of gunpowder. On 16 April 1600, Sir Henry Docwra entered Derry with a force of 4,000 soldiers. He tore down the ruins of the Big Church and used its stones to build the walls and ramparts of the city. A small square stone tablet from An Teampall Mór is today fixed into the porch of the present structure. The Latin inscription reads "In Templo Vervs Devs Est Verec Colendvs" ("The True God is in His Temple and is to be truly worshipped"). The cathedral is located close to the original.

The present church was built by William Parratt, from London, and was consecrated in 1633. It is a good example of "Gothic Survival" in the English Gothic architecture of the 17th century, contemporary with the college chapel of Peterhouse, Cambridge. The style has been called "Planter's Gothic". Foundations for a chancel extending the east end were laid in 1633, but the building work advanced no further. In the porch is an inscription:

This spire lasted only two decades before it threatened to collapse and was dismantled for rebuilding. The tower was finished in 1802, but the replacement spire was built another two decades later. The original south porch, attached to the hitherto unaltered nave, was removed in 1825, and in 1827 the turrets on either side of the east end were remodelled, with their previously crenellated tops rebuilt with domes.

In 1861–1862, the whole interior was remodelled with new woodwork in oak, and the galleries which had previously been in the aisles were removed. Other decorations and furnishings were replaced at the same time. In 1887, in beginning work for a new chancel, the 17th-century foundations were unearthed, and the new chancel was constructed on their plan, completing the church's intended form.

The chapter house was built in 1910.

St Columb's has in its possession many documents dating back from the Siege of Derry. They have portraits of William of Orange and the original keys of the city.

The cathedral also contains a memorial to Valentine Munbee McMaster VC.

Services
The cathedral has three Sunday services, 8:00 am Eucharist, 11:00 am Sung Eucharist (1st and 3rd Sundays of the month), Matins (all other Sundays of the month), 10:00 am Family Service (4th Sunday of the month) and 4:00 pm Choral Evensong.

On weekdays Morning Prayer is celebrated Mondays, Wednesdays, Thursdays and Fridays at 10:30 am and on Tuesdays Holy Communion is celebrated with intercessions for the sick.

Dean of 19 years, the Reverend William Morton, retired on 18 September 2016 and was appointed dean of St Patrick's Cathedral, Dublin. In the transition period, before the appointment of a new dean, the Bishop of Derry and Raphoe, Ken Good, appointed the Reverend Mervyn T. E. Peoples to assist the cathedral's curate, the Reverend Canon John Merrick.

On 4 December 2016, Bishop Good appointed the Reverend Canon Raymond Stewart as the new dean of Saint Columb's Cathedral and rector of the Parish of Templemore. Stewart was inaugurated on 28 March 2017 at the cathedral by Bishop Good and succeeded the Rev William Morton who became dean of St Patrick's Cathedral, Dublin in September 2016.

Organists

1873-1878 James Turpin
1878-1911 Daniel Jones
1912-1914 Sydney Weale
1914-1921 Richard Henry Coleman
1921-1948 John T Frankland
1948-1968 Michael H Franklin
1968-1971 Neil Wade
1971 Ian Barber
1972-1980 Michael Hoeg
1981-1982 Marc Rochester
1982-1988 William West
1988-1990? Alexander Best
1990-1991 William West
1991-2001 Timothy Allen
2002-2004 Jonathan Lane
2005-     Ian Kenneth Mills

Burials
William Nicolson, Bishop of Derry (1718–1727)

See also 

 St Eugene's Cathedral in the Roman Catholic Diocese of Derry

References

External links

 St Columb's Cathedral website
 Details of the organ from the National Pipe Organ Register

Derry
Diocese of Derry and Raphoe
Grade A listed buildings
Religious buildings and structures in Derry (city)
Churches in County Londonderry
Religious buildings and structures completed in 1633
1633 establishments in the British Empire